The 1988 Hall of Fame Bowl, part of the 1987 bowl game season, took place on January 2, 1988, at Tampa Stadium in Tampa, Florida. The competing teams in the second edition of the Hall of Fame Bowl were the Alabama Crimson Tide, representing the Southeastern Conference (SEC), and the Michigan Wolverines of the Big Ten Conference. In what was the first ever meeting between the schools, Michigan was victorious by a final score of 28–24.

Teams

Alabama

The 1987 Alabama squad finished the regular season with losses to Florida, Memphis State, Notre Dame and Auburn to compile a 7–4 record. Following their loss against Auburn in the Iron Bowl, the Crimson Tide accepted an invitation to play in the Hall of Fame Bowl. The appearance marked the first for Alabama in the Hall of Fame Bowl, and their 40th overall bowl game.

Michigan

The 1987 Michigan squad finished the regular season with losses to Notre Dame, Michigan State, Indiana and Ohio State to finish with a record of 7–4. Their appearance marked the first for Michigan in the Hall of Fame Bowl, and their 19th overall bowl game. In mid December 1987, head coach Bo Schembechler underwent quadruple bypass heart surgery and was unable to coach in the bowl game. Due to this circumstance, Gary Moeller was given the coaching responsibilities for the game.

Game summary
Alabama scored first following a 51-yard field goal by kicker Philip Doyle, and led 3–0 after the first quarter. In the second quarter, Jamie Morris scored on touchdown runs of 25 and 14 yards as Michigan took a 14–3 lead to halftime. In the third quarter, Morris scored on a 77-yard touchdown run, stretching Michigan's lead to 21–3. Alabama responded with a 16-yard touchdown pass from Jeff Dunn to tight end Howard Cross, making it 21–9. In the fourth quarter, Bobby Humphrey scored on touchdown runs of 1 and 17 yards as Alabama took a 24–21 lead. Michigan scored the game-winning touchdown on a 20-yard pass from Demetrius Brown to John Kolesar for a 28–24 win.

References

External links
 Summary at Bentley Historical Library, University of Michigan Athletics History

1987–88 NCAA football bowl games
1988
1988
1988
1988 in sports in Florida
20th century in Tampa, Florida
January 1988 sports events in the United States